Synuchus arcuaticollis is a species of ground beetle in the subfamily Harpalinae. It was described by Victor Motschulsky in 1860.

References

Synuchus
Beetles described in 1860